Jean Cacharel SA is a French company of ready-to-wear clothing, perfume and accessories, founded in 1958 by Jean Bousquet. Cacharel designs are characterized by their youthful style, femininity, lightness, refinement, and use of bright colours. Cacharel is named after the local name of the garganey (Anas querquedula, a small duck) in the Camargue (cacharel, standard French sarcelle d'été).

History
Cacharel was created in 1958 by the French politician Jean Bousque in Nîmes, where he was mayor of the commune for two mandates. 

Jean Bousquet was the son of a sewing machine salesman; he was immersed in the world of clothes-making since childhood. He trained to be a tailor at a technical college and worked for two years as a designer before returning to Paris to found his own fashion house in Le Marais. The success of his first collection inspired him to create Cacharel.

Cacharel designs are characteristic for their youthful style, femininity, lightness, refinement and use of bright colours. The presentation of the first blouse collection in Paris brought attention for its cheerfulness and the modern vision of women that it represented. The introduction of the seersucker blouse and a front cover in Elle magazine in 1963 launched Cacharel onto the international stage.

Licenses and partnerships
Since 1975 Bousquet commissioned L'Oréal to create a perfume for his brand; the successful Anaïs Anaïs was launched in 1978. It was followed by Cacharel pour l'Homme, Loulou, Eden, Loulou Blue, Eau d'Eden, Noa, Nemo, Gloria, Amor Amor, Amor Amor Eau Fraiche, Noa Fleur, Noa Perle, Promesse, Amor pour homme and Scarlett. The perfume "Liberté", is an orange chypre with fresh citrus top notes inspired by a traditional French cake called 'chamonix' and woody heart and base notes with patchouli. The person representing Liberté in ad campaigns is Brazilian-born model, Gisele Bündchen, who is also the new face for the brand Cacharel Parfums, following Kate Moss who modeled for Anaïs Anaïs and Laetitia Casta for Promesse.

The jewelry and watch license is managed by Christian Bernard Group. Several other licenses have been granted to market products under the Cacharel brand such as notebooks by Clairefontaine and underwear by Éminence.  Shortterm collaborations were made with other brands like Eastpak for bags in 2009 and Uniqlo for t-shirts in 2011. In 1997, for an exhibition at the New National Museum of Monaco , Cacharel dressed a Barbie doll .

Shareholding
Cacharel is owned by Jean Bousquet's family which holds 80% stake in the company and by Novinvest of Rothschild, which holds 20%.

References

External links

 

Clothing brands of France
Clothing companies of France
High fashion brands
Perfume houses
French brands
Eyewear brands of France
French companies established in 1958
Clothing companies established in 1958
Manufacturing companies based in Paris
Watch manufacturing companies of France
Design companies established in 1958